Bernard Arthur Smart (24 December 1891 in Luton, north of London – May 1979 in Luton) was a British pilot during World War I, who performed some of the world's first attacks from early aircraft carriers, which were cruisers that had been rebuilt with catapults and a small flying deck.

History

Downing of Airship L23

After destroying the airship Bernard A. Smart was actually unsure of where his support ships were located as he had been disoriented during the attack. Luckily the smoke from the airship attracted a British Navy squadron and he was able to ditch his plane in the water and was rescued by a British destroyer.

On 19 July 1918, he was sent from HMS Furious ca. 15 miles west of Lyngvig lighthouse as a pilot on a Sopwith Camel plane and led to the Tønder Bombing Raid of the airship base in Tønder, where the air ships L 54 and L 60 were burned in the big Toska hall.
 
Smart was honored 9 weeks after the shooting of L 23 with the Distinguished Service Order. He was honored again on 24 July 1918, on board HMS Furious in the presence of Admiral David Beatty, when to his great surprise, he was presented with an extra bar for his DSO by King George V.

Home in Luton
Bernard Arthur Smart was the son of Charles Smart and wife Kate in Luton and worked in the parents' company in 1911, producing straw hats. At the age of 24 years on 24 July 1916, he qualified to become a pilot in the Royal Naval Air Service. After the war, in 1919, he retired as a pilot and became a businessman. In 1927, he became a cousin of Geoffrey Bowman Jenkins' company Bowman Models in Dereham, Norfolk, producing toys such as steam engines, boats, and locomotives.

Smart died in 1979 in Luton and in 2011 some of his possessions were sold, including his DSO medal, which went under the hammer for £63,000 (£  in ).

The official death record indicates that Smart died in Norfolk, reading: Bernard Arthur Smart at East Dereham - June quarter (10 1008) - Born Dec 24th 1891

Bibliography 
Notes

References 
 
 
  - Total pages: 64 

Royal Flying Corps officers
British World War I flying aces
1891 births
1979 deaths